Shannon Gilligan is an author of interactive fiction and computer games.

Early life and education
Gilligan graduated from Williams College in 1981 and spent a year abroad at Doshisha University in Kyoto, Japan.

Career
Gilligan has been extensively involved in the Choose Your Own Adventure series, having written five books in the main series and six others in the "Younger Readers" series. Her stepsons, Ramsey Montgomery(deceased) and Anson Montgomery, wrote several books in the series as well.  Shannon was married to the series co-founder, R. A. Montgomery.  She also writes the History Mystery Series and Our Secret Gang series for children. Over 2 million copies of her books are in print in several languages including English, Italian, Spanish and Turkish. She also worked in mystery computer games for Activision such as The Elk Moon Murder and the Murder Mystery series for Creative Multimedia. She was the first person to be inducted into the Mystery Writers of America based on interactive works.

Bibliography

Choose Your Own Adventure series
 #14 The Search for Champ (November 1983)
 #15 The Three Wishes (April 1984)
 #21 Mona Is Missing (October 1984)
 #29 The Fairy Kidnap (August 1985)
 #33 Haunted Harbor (April 1986)
 #43 Home in Time for Christmas (December 1987)
 #44 The Mystery of Ura Senke (May 1985)
 #53 The Case of the Silk King (February 1986, adapted by ABC for an hour-long prime-time special)
 #81 Terror in Australia (July 1988)
 #119 The Terrorist Trap (November 1991)
 #127 Showdown (August 1992)

Mystery games
 The Elk Moon Murder
 Who Killed Brett Penace? The Environmental Surfer
 Who Killed Sam Rupert?
 Who Killed Elspeth Haskard? The Magic Death
 Who Killed Taylor French?
 Comic Creator

See also 

 List of Choose Your Own Adventure books

References

External links
 Official Choose Your Own Adventure site

Living people
Year of birth missing (living people)
American children's writers
American mystery writers
Choose Your Own Adventure writers
American women children's writers
Women mystery writers
American women novelists
21st-century American women